Colestah (born around 1800, died 1865), was one of the five wives of Chief Kamiakin (1800–1877) of the Yakama Native American tribe. She is described as being a medicine woman (twati), a psychic, and a  "warrior woman".

Early life
Colestah was the youngest daughter of Chief Tenax (Klickitat). Her older sisters were Kem-ee-yowah, Why-luts-pum and Hos-ke-la-pum. She bore two children with Kamiakin: Tomeo and Tomomolow (Tomolio).

Battle of Four Lakes
On September 5, 1858, she accompanied Kamiakin to the Battle of Four Lakes (or Battle of Spokane Plains) against Colonel George Wright, armed with a stone war club, vowing to fight by his side. According to the historian of criminal justice, Kurt R. Nelson, she dressed formally for the battle in "her finest" buckskin dress, with her hair braided tightly. When Kamiakin was seriously wounded by a branch dislodged by a howitzer shell, Colestah carried him back to the family camp located at the Spokane River and used her skills as an "Indian doctor" in traditional tribal medicine to nurse him back to health.

Colestah and Kamiakin moved to the Palouse River camp, between today's St. John and Endicott in 1860, where his family followed its "seasonal rounds of root-digging, berry-gathering and salmon fishing." Colestah had a new son, Tomolow, with Kamiakin in 1864, but then she became sick, and died in 1865.

References

Year of birth unknown
1800s births
1865 deaths
19th-century Native Americans
History of Spokane, Washington
Native American history of Washington (state)
Native American people of the Indian Wars
Native American women in warfare
People from Whitman County, Washington
Women in 19th-century warfare
Yakama
19th-century Native American women